Leon I of Abkhazia, hereditary prince (Eristavi) of Abkhazia, ruling  between 720–740 and a vassal to the Byzantine Emperor. The Divan of the Abkhazian Kings mentions that his reign took place in the 1st half of the 8th century. During his reign Leon actively battled invading Arabs and had close diplomatic contacts with the prince of Iberia and Kakheti, Archil. He also had significant relations to the Byzantine emperor Leo III the Isaurian, to whom he sent a letter asking for help against the forces of the Umayyad Caliphate. In answer, the Emperor confirmed his hereditary rule over the Kingdom of Abkhazia and suggested that he should accept Archil as his overlord and suzerain and by doing so, battle the Muslims with united forces. Leo III also bestowed the title of Archon upon the Abkhazian King. This meant that the Byzantines accepted Leon I's rule over the lands of Egrisi, Jiketi and Sanigia. The ties between Archil and Leon I were also strengthened by Leon's marriage with Gurandukht, the daughter of Archil's brother Mirian of Kakheti.

In 735, a large expedition led by Arab general Marwan was launched against the Georgian kingdoms. The Kingdom of Abkhazia suffered greatly from the invasion. After the pivotal siege of Anakopia, the Arabs were decisively defeated and retreated with heavy losses. During the invasion, Archil took shelter in the Kingdom of Abkhazia. Assisted by Leon, they participated in many important battles against the Arabs, including the siege of Anakopia. The reign of Leon I was a very important episode in the history of Georgia. Despite heavy losses, the Georgians managed to dissipate the invading Arab forces, which undoubtedly determined the survival of Christianity and statehood in Western Georgia, with long lasting future consequences.

Genealogy

See also
 Divan of the Abkhazian Kings

References
 Georgian Soviet encyclopedia, vol. 6, pg. 191, Tb., 1983.

8th-century Kings of Abkhazia
People of the Arab–Byzantine wars